The Girl from the Main refers to an unidentified murder victim found in the Main River in Nied, Germany. The decedent, aged 15–16 at the time of her death, had been physically abused and finally murdered before being dumped into the river, when she was found on 31 July 2001.

Case summary 
On 31 July 2001, around 2:50 PM, passers-by found the wrapped and bound nude body of a 15-to-16-year-old girl.  The body had a number of injuries all over which indicated serious abuse suffered over a period of years, none of which had been treated by a doctor. Among other things, her arms were malformed as a result of healed fractures, there were numerous longer scars in the area of the legs, trunk and forehead, burn scars from cigarettes, and a cauliflower ear caused by injury were found during the autopsy.

It is believed that the girl looked about two years younger than her actual age, as she was in a stage of puberty more typical of that of a 13 year old girl. Her teeth were in poor condition, and there were no wisdom teeth. Her face was still in mostly recognizable condition, but her eye color was no longer ascertainable.

The victim's body had likely been in the water for 12–14 hours, and her murder had likely occurred approximately three days prior to discovery. Death occurred as a result of two fractured ribs that injured the lungs and spleen, caused by blunt force trauma. The body was tied up and weighed down with a parasol stand and thrown into the Main. Investigations revealed that the girl most likely was thrown into the water between the Griesheim barrage and the Wörthspitze. Among other things, due to a scarf-like object she had on her, it is assumed that the girl originated from the Pakistan-Afghanistan border area, but was living in the Frankfurt Rhine-Main area, perhaps as a servant. However, on-site investigation revealed no clues about her identity or that of her killer(s). It cannot be excluded that the girl entered through diplomatic circles, in which investigations are difficult due to political immunity. The body was buried in the Heiligenstock cemetery; the funeral was financed by donations from the investigators. The case consistently receives substantial attention even after more than ten years.

See also 
List of unsolved murders

References

External links 
 Case on the website of the Federal Criminal Police Office
 The girl from the Main from Taunus Zeitung (Frankfurter Neue Presse), dated 30 July 2011
 First report on "Aktenzeichen XY… ungelöst", dated 7 September 2001
 Second report, from 2:50 of "Aktenzeichen XY… ungelöst", dated 24 June 2009

1980s births
2001 murders in Germany
2001 deaths
Deaths by person in Germany
Female murder victims
People from Frankfurt
Unidentified murder victims
Unsolved murders in Germany